Bargabhima Temple is a Hindu temple in Tamluk near Kolkata in Purba Medinipur district of West Bengal. It is around 87.2 km from Kolkata, 85 km from Kharagpur, and well connected by NH-6 and south eastern railway tracks. It is an Kali temple. This place has been mentioned in Mahabharata as a place which Bhima acquired. This temple is considered as 51 shakti peth of mother Durga where left ankle of sati fell. The temple has been declared by Heritage Site by West Bengal Govt. The current temple is not very old as it was rebuilt after the Islamic occupation of Bengal in the Middle Ages. In old Bengali literature, the temple was mentioned several times. The temple is the mixture of Bengali Hindu and Buddhist culture. Due to this Shakti tradition, many freedom fighter of Midnapore district took oath here that they will follow the path of dharma and free their motherland with the help of armed revolution. Famous revolutionary freedom fighter of India Khudiram Bosu used to come here to perform puja. The local people celebrate a large festival on Durga Puja, Bengali new year and Kali puja in this temple. In this temple prasad is prepared everyday for Devi Bargabhima and like most of the Shakti temple, prasad of Devi is not veg. Prasad of Devi is non-veg here and a cooked Snakehead murrel (শোল মাছ, 'sol mach') is mandatory for her. The bali ritual is abolished now, but once in a year it happens now.

How to reach 
Tamluk is well connected by highways and railways:
 Tamluk to Mecheda, Kolaghat, Kolkata
 Tamluk to Mecheda, Kolaghat, Panskura, Kharagpur
 Tamluk to Panskura Railways
 Tamluk to Haldia Railways
 Tamluk to Digha Railways
 Howrah to Haldia Railtrack
 Howrah to Digha Railtrack
 Haldia - Panskura - Kharagpur Railtrack

References

Hindu temples in West Bengal
Temples in West Bengal
Tourist attractions in Purba Medinipur district